Tvrdići is a village in the municipality of Požega, western Serbia. According to the 2002 census, the village has a population of 275 people.
Demographic changes as follows:
1948	1953	1961	1971	1981	1991	2002	2011 
Population change as follows:
422	428	412	349	318	305	275 2	257 1

References

Populated places in Zlatibor District